Christine Jorgensen (May 30, 1926 – May 3, 1989) was an American trans woman who was the first person to become widely known in the United States for having sex reassignment surgery. She had a successful career as an actress, singer, and recording artist.

Jorgensen was drafted into the U.S. Army during World War II. After she served as a military clerical worker, Jorgensen attended several schools, worked, and pursued a photography career. During this time, she learned about sex reassignment surgery and traveled to Europe, where in Copenhagen, Denmark, she obtained special permission to undergo a series of operations beginning in 1952.

Upon her return to the United States in the early 1950s, her transition was the subject of a New York Daily News front-page story. She became an instant celebrity, known for her directness and polished wit, and used the platform to advocate for transgender people. 

Jorgensen often lectured on the experience of being transgender and published an autobiography in 1967.

Early life
Jorgensen was the second child of carpenter and contractor George William Jorgensen and his wife, Florence Davis Hansen. She was named George William, after her father, when she was born. She was raised in the Belmont neighborhood of the Bronx, New York City, and baptized a Lutheran. She described herself as a "frail, blond, introverted little boy who ran from fistfights and rough-and-tumble games".

Jorgensen graduated from Christopher Columbus High School in 1945 and was soon drafted into the U.S. Army at 19. After being discharged from the Army, she attended Mohawk Valley Community College in Utica, New York; the Progressive School of Photography in New Haven, Connecticut; and the Manhattan Medical and Dental Assistant School in New York City. She also worked briefly for Pathé News.

Gender transition
Returning to New York after military service, and increasingly concerned over, as one obituary later called it, a "lack of male physical development", Jorgensen heard about sex reassignment surgery. She began taking estrogen in the form of ethinylestradiol. She started researching the surgery with the help of Joseph Angelo, the husband of a classmate at the Manhattan Medical and Dental Assistant School. Jorgensen intended to go to Sweden, where the only doctors worldwide who performed the surgery were located. During a stopover in Copenhagen to visit relatives, she met Christian Hamburger, a Danish endocrinologist and specialist in rehabilitative hormonal therapy. Jorgensen stayed in Denmark and underwent hormone replacement therapy under Hamburger's direction. She chose the name Christine in honor of Hamburger.

Doctor Hamburger explained the gender hormone procedure, "The first sign was an increase in size of the mammary glands and then hair began to grow where the patient had a bald patch on the temple. Finally the whole body changed from a male to a female shape.'' More than a year after beginning hormone therapy, Jorgensen received her first surgery. However, she never publicly explained her new anatomy or the surgery outcome but said, "Everyone is both sexes in varying degrees. I am more of a woman than a man… Of course I can never have children but this does not mean that I cannot have natural sexual intercourse - I am very much in the position right now of a woman who has a hysterectomy," in 1958.

Her parents were from Denmark, so her trip for reassignment surgery was easy to disguise as a trip to visit family. She did not relay her plan for procedures on the trip to anyone due to her concern that she would not be supported.

She obtained special permission from the Danish Minister of Justice to undergo a series of operations in Denmark. On September 24, 1951, surgeons at Gentofte Hospital in Copenhagen performed an orchiectomy on Jorgensen. In a letter to friends on October 8, 1951, she referred to how the surgery affected her:

In November 1952, doctors at Copenhagen University Hospital performed a penectomy. In Jorgensen's words, "My second operation, as the previous one, was not such a major work of surgery as it may imply."

She returned to the United States and eventually obtained a vaginoplasty when the procedure became available. The vaginoplasty was performed under the direction of Angelo, with Harry Benjamin as a medical adviser. Later, in the preface of Jorgensen's autobiography, Harry Benjamin gave her credit for the advancement of his studies. He wrote, "Indeed Christine, without you, probably none of this would have happened; the grant, my publications, lectures, etc."

Publicity
Jorgensen was publicly outed when her letter to her parents in New York leaked to the press. She had planned to keep her transition a secret but she was forcefully outed by the New York Daily News. Her letter stated, "Nature made a mistake which I have had corrected, and now I am your daughter."

The New York Daily News ran a front-page story on December 1, 1952, under the headline "Ex-GI Becomes Blonde Beauty", announcing (incorrectly) that Jorgensen had become the recipient of the first "sex change". German doctors had previously performed this type of surgery in the late 1920s and early 1930s. Dorchen Richter and Danish artist Lili Elbe, both patients of Magnus Hirschfeld at the Institut für Sexualwissenschaft in Berlin, were known recipients of such operations.

After her surgeries, Jorgensen originally stated that she wanted a quiet life of her design. However, upon returning to the United States, she could only earn a living by making public appearances. Jorgensen was an instant celebrity when she returned to New York in February 1953. A large crowd of journalists met her as she came off her flight, and despite the Danish royal family being on the same flight, the audience largely ignored them in favor of Jorgensen. Soon after her arrival, she launched a successful nightclub act and appeared on television, radio, and theatrical productions. The first five-part authorized account of her story was written by herself in a February 1953 issue of The American Weekly, titled "The Story of My Life." In 1967, she published her autobiography, Christine Jorgensen: A Personal Autobiography, which sold almost 450,000 copies.

The publicity following her transition and gender reassignment surgery became "a model for other transsexuals for decades. She was a tireless lecturer on the subject of transsexuality, pleading for understanding from a public that all too often wanted to see transsexuals as freaks or perverts ... Ms Jorgensen's poise, charm, and wit won the hearts of millions." However, over time the press was much less fascinated by her and started to scrutinize her much more harshly. Print media often asked her if she would pose nude in their publications.

Later life

After her vaginoplasty, Jorgensen planned to marry labor union statistician John Traub, but the engagement was called off. In 1959 she announced her engagement to typist Howard J. Knox in Massapequa Park, New York, where her father built her a house after reassignment surgery. She and Knox settled down and joined a Lutheran church. However, the couple was unable to obtain a marriage license because Jorgensen's birth certificate listed her as male. In a report about the broken engagement, The New York Times reported that Knox had lost his job in Washington, D.C. when his engagement to Jorgensen became known.

After her parents died, Jorgensen moved to California in 1967. She left behind the ranch home built by her father in Massapequa and settled at the Chateau Marmont in Los Angeles. During this same year, Jorgensen published her autobiography, Christine Jorgensen: A Personal Autobiography, which chronicled her life experiences as a transsexual and included her perspectives on some of her significant life events. In her autobiography, Jorgensen revealed her struggles with depression. She explained how her mental health deteriorated and contemplated suicide but did not act on it. She wrote, “The answer to the problem must not lie in sleeping pills and suicides that look like accidents, or in jail sentences, but rather in life and the freedom to live it.” 

During the 1970s and 1980s, Jorgensen toured university campuses and other venues to speak about her experiences. She was known for her directness and polished wit. She once demanded an apology from Vice President Spiro T. Agnew when he called Charles Goodell "the Christine Jorgensen of the Republican Party". Agnew refused her request.

Jorgensen also worked as an actress and nightclub entertainer and recorded several songs. In summer stock, she played Madame Rosepettle in the play Oh Dad, Poor Dad, Mamma's Hung You in the Closet and I'm Feelin' So Sad. In her nightclub act, she sang several songs, including "I Enjoy Being a Girl," in which, in the end, she made a quick change into a Wonder Woman costume.

She later recalled that Warner Communications, owners of the Wonder Woman character's copyright, demanded she quit using the character. She did so, using instead a new character of her invention, Superwoman, who was marked by the inclusion of a large letter S on her cape. Jorgensen continued her act, performing at Freddy's Supper Club on the Upper East Side of Manhattan until at least 1982 when she performed twice in the Hollywood area: once at the Backlot Theatre, adjacent to the discothèque Studio One, and later at The Frog Pond restaurant. The performance was recorded and made available as an album on iTunes. In 1984, Jorgensen returned to Copenhagen to perform her show and was featured in Teit Ritzau's Danish transsexual documentary film Paradiset er ikke til salg (Paradise Is Not for Sale). Jorgensen was the first and only known trans woman to perform at Oscar's Delmonico Restaurant in downtown New York, for which owners Oscar and Mario Tucci received criticism.

She died of bladder and lung cancer on May 3, 1989, at age 62. Her ashes were scattered off Dana Point, California.

Legacy
Jorgensen's highly publicized transition helped bring to light gender identity and shaped a new culture of more inclusive ideas about the subject. As a transgender spokesperson and public figure, she influenced other transgender people to change their sex and names on their birth certificates. Jorgensen saw herself as a founding member in what became known as the "sexual revolution." In a Los Angeles Times interview, Jorgensen stated, "I am very proud now, looking back, that I was on that street corner 36 years ago when a movement started. It was the sexual revolution that was going to start with or without me. We may not have started it, but we gave it a good swift kick in the pants."

In 2012, Jorgensen was inducted into Chicago's Legacy Walk, an outdoor public display celebrating LGBT history and people.

In 2014, Jorgensen was one of the inaugural honorees in the Rainbow Honor Walk, a walk of fame in San Francisco's Castro neighborhood, noting LGBTQ people who have "made significant contributions in their fields".

In June 2019, Jorgensen was one of the inaugural 50 American "pioneers, trailblazers, and heroes" included on the National LGBTQ Wall of Honor within the Stonewall National Monument (SNM) in New York City's Stonewall Inn. The SNM is the first U.S. national monument dedicated to LGBTQ rights and history, and the wall's unveiling was timed to take place during the 50th anniversary of the Stonewall riots.

In popular culture
During his earlier career as a calypso singer under the name The Charmer, Nation of Islam leader Louis Farrakhan recorded a song about Jorgensen, "Is She Is or Is She Ain't." (The title is a play on the 1940s Louis Jordan song, "Is You Is or Is You Ain't My Baby".)

Chuck Renslow and Dom Orejudos founded Kris Studios, a male physique photography studio that took photos for gay magazines they published, which was named in part to honor Jorgensen.

Posters for the Ed Wood film Glen or Glenda (1953), also known as I Changed My Sex and I Led Two Lives, publicize the movie as being based on Jorgensen's life. Originally producer George Weiss made her some offers to appear in the film, but she turned them down. Jorgensen is mentioned in connection with Glen in Tim Burton's biopic Ed Wood (1994), but Jorgensen is not depicted as a character.

The Christine Jorgensen Story, a fictionalized biopic based on Jorgensen's memoir, premiered in 1970. John Hansen played Jorgensen as an adult, while Trent Lehman played her at age seven.

In Christine Jorgensen Reveals, a stage performance at the 2005 Edinburgh Festival Fringe, Jorgensen was portrayed by Bradford Louryk. To critical acclaim, Louryk dressed as Jorgensen and performed in a recorded interview with her during the 1950s. At the same time, a video of Rob Grace as comically inept interviewer Nipsey Russell played on a nearby black-and-white television set. The show went on to win Best Aspect of Production at the 2006 Dublin Gay Theatre Festival, and it ran Off-Broadway at New World Stages in January 2006. The LP was reissued on CD by Repeat The Beat Records in 2005.

Transgender historian and critical theorist Susan Stryker directed and produced an experimental documentary  about Jorgensen, titled Christine in the Cutting Room. In 2010 she also presented a lecture at Yale University titled "Christine in the Cutting Room: Christine Jorgensen's Transsexual Celebrity and Cinematic Embodiment". Both works examine embodiment vis-à-vis cinema.

The 2016 book Andy Warhol was a Hoarder: Inside the Minds of History's Great Personalities, by journalist Claudia Kalb, devotes a chapter to Jorgensen's story, using her as an example of gender dysphoria and the process of gender transition in its earliest days.

Books

See also

 April Ashley, second publicized British citizen to undergo SRS
 Coccinelle, first publicized French citizen to undergo SRS
 Roberta Cowell, first publicized British citizen to undergo SRS
 Lili Elbe, first publicized Danish citizen to undergo SRS
 Charlotte Frances McLeod, second American woman to undergo SRS in Denmark
 Maryam Khatoon Molkara, first publicized Iranian citizen to undergo SRS
 Xie Jianshun, Taiwanese intersex soldier who was often called "Chinese Christine"

References

Citations

General and cited references

External links
 BBC article about Christine Jorgensen, November 2012
 GLTBQ.com article: Christine Jorgensen
 Christine Jorgensen Website, with newsreel footage, songs, and other performances
 
 Christine Jorgensen, A Transsexual Media Sensation, Transgender Zone Media Archives.
 Christine Jorgensen Collection at the Digital Transgender Archive

1926 births
1989 deaths
American LGBT military personnel
20th-century American memoirists
Writers from the Bronx
LGBT people from New York (state)
Transgender singers
Transgender actresses
Transgender military personnel
American LGBT singers
American people of Danish descent
Military personnel from New York City
United States Army soldiers
Women in the United States Army
American women in World War II
20th-century American actresses
Deaths from bladder cancer
Deaths from lung cancer in California
20th-century American singers
American women memoirists
Transgender memoirists
United States Army personnel of World War II
American transgender writers
20th-century American LGBT people
American LGBT actors
Transgender women musicians